Rock Ridge High School is a public secondary school in Ashburn, Loudoun County, Virginia.  The school is part of the Loudoun County Public Schools system.  It is currently the fourth newest high school in the school system. Rock Ridge's student body is drawn from the Ashburn and Dulles area.

References

Public high schools in Virginia
Educational institutions established in 2014
Schools in Loudoun County, Virginia
2014 establishments in Virginia